Waris Baig is a Pakistani film playback singer.

Early life and career 
Waris Baig  was born in Lahore. He completed his education at Government College Lahore. His first music album was released in 1989 called “Music 89”. He started his playback singing career in 1997, with Syed Noor's film “Sangam”.

Awards and recognition
Pride of Performance Award by the President of Pakistan in 2020.
Nigar Award for Best Male Singer in Mujhe Chand Chahiye (2000 film).

Discography

References

External links
 

1965 births
Living people
Government College University, Lahore alumni
Nigar Award winners
Pakistani male singers
Pakistani playback singers
Pakistani Sunni Muslims
Punjabi people
Punjabi-language singers
Punjabi singers
Singers from Lahore
Recipients of the Pride of Performance